Okuz Gonbadi (also Romanized as Okūz Gonbadī; also known as Āgūz Gonbadī) is a village in Kuhsar Rural District, in the Central District of Hashtrud County, East Azerbaijan Province, Iran. At the 2006 census, its population was 459, in 99 families.

References 

Towns and villages in Hashtrud County